Stella Damasus  (born April 24, 1978) is a Nigerian actress and singer. She was nominated for Best Actress in a Leading Role at the Africa Movie Academy Awards in 2009. She won the Award for Best Actress at the Nigeria Entertainment Awards in 2007 In 2012 she won the award for Best Actress for the movie Two Brides and a Baby at the Golden Icons Academy Awards in Houston, Texas.

Early life
Stella Damasus was born in Benin City, Edo State in Nigeria. She has four sisters. She grew up in Benin City where she completed most of her primary education.

Personal life
Damasus married her first husband, Jaiye Aboderin, at 21 in 1999. The couple had two daughters before Jaiye died suddenly in 2004. Damasus remarried in 2007, this time to Emeka Nzeribe. The marriage lasted for seven months before a mutual agreement to divorce. In 2011, she became associated with multiple award-winning Nollywood producer & director Daniel Ademinokan; this eventually also led to a separation in 2020 and subsequent divorce. Their relationship sparked a lot of controversy because both parties never publicly admitted to be dating, engaged or even married until 2014.

Career
Damasus started her career as a singer in Lagos where she used to work as a studio session singer at the famous Klink Studios owned by filmmaker Kingsley Ogoro. There she honed her skills as singer and went on to do vocals for the top jingles on radio and TV in Nigeria at that time.

Damasus is a Theatre arts graduate of the University of Lagos. She first appeared in the Nigerian film Abused in 1992. Her claim to fame, however, was her second movie Breaking Point produced by Emem Isong and directed by Francis Agu where she shot into superstardom across Nigeria. She was nominated for the African Movie Academy Award in 2006 for "Best Actress in a Leading Role" for her performance in the movie "Behind closed doors". She was also nominated, in 2008, for the African Movie Academy Award for "Best Actress in a Leading Role" in the movie "Widow" and in 2009 in the movie "State of the Heart". She has gone on to star in over 70 movies. and is now the co founder of I2radio and hosts two podcast shows, Undiluted with Stella Damasus and When Women Praise.

Filmography

See also
 List of Nigerian actors

References

External links
 

Living people
Nigerian television personalities
21st-century Nigerian women singers
1978 births
People from Benin City
University of Lagos alumni
Actresses from Delta State
Musicians from Delta State
20th-century Nigerian actresses
21st-century Nigerian actresses
Nigerian film actresses
Nigerian film award winners